Half Ton class was an offshore sailing class of the International Offshore Rule racing the Half Ton Cup between 1967 and 1993.

History
In order that yachts of different types can race against each other, there are handicap rules which are applied to differect boat designs. The Half Ton Class was created by the Offshore Racing Council for boats within the racing band not exceeding 22'-0". The ORC decided that the rule should "....permit the development of seaworthy offshore racing yachts...The Council will endeavour to protect the majority of the existing IOR fleet from rapid obsolescence caused  by ....developments which produce increased performance without corresponding changes in ratings..."

When first introduced the IOR rule was perfectly adequate for rating boats in existence at that time. However yacht designers naturally examined the rule to seize upon any advantage they could find, the most noticeable of which has been a reduction in displacement and a return to fractional rigs.

After 1993, when the IOR Mk.III rule reached it termination due to lack of people building new boats, the rule was replaced by the CHS (Channel) Handicap system which in turn developed into the IRC system now used.

The IRC handicap system operates by a secret formula which tries to develop boats which are 'Cruising type' of relatively heavy boats with good internal accommodation. It tends to penalise boats with excessive stability or excessive sail area.

Competitions
The most significant events for the Half Ton Class has been the annual Half Ton Cup which was sailed under the IOR rules until 1993. More recently this has been replaced with the Half Ton Classics Cup.  The venue of the event moved from continent to continent with over-representation on French or British ports. In latter years the event is held Biannually. Initially it was proposed to hold events in Ireland, Britain and France by rotation. However it was the Belgians who took the ball and ran with it. The Class is now managed from Belgium. The next event will be held in Ireland for the second time in Kinsale, Co. Cork.

Numerous IOR rated 1/2 tonne boats during the period this class competed also raced in classic offshore races including the world renowned Sydney to Hobart.

Half Ton Cup

The Half Ton class racing the Half Ton Cup between 1967 and 1993.

Half Ton Classics Cup
The idea of holding a Half Ton Classics Cup first arose at Cork Week in 2000 when the Crew of 'Sibelius' (FRA) including Didier Dardot and his wife and the crew of 'SpACE Odyssey' (IRL) including Shay Moran, Enda Connellan, Terry Madigan and Vincent Delany agreed that it would be a great idea to organiser a bi-annual event for Half Tonners under the IRC handicap system with the venue rotating between France, England and Ireland. In fact Didier Dardot was unable to persuade La Trinite or any other French clubs to organise the first event. However the Half Ton enthusiasts of Nieupoort organised the first event in Belgium.
By 2017 it was evident that only expensively optimised boats were capable of winning the Half Ton Classics Cup. Without mentioning names- these boats were stripped down to the original hull, with new decks, deck hardware, keels, rigs and sails. Owners of boats which were not so rebuilt contented themselves with the status of the 'mid fleet club'. Thus numbers competing declined.

Criteria 
Note 1. Boats must have been designed as IOR boats during the period 1967-1992.
 Note 2. Boats may be modified, but the hulls must be original.
 Note 3. Keels and rudders may be modified.
 Note 4. Rigs may be modified.
 Note 5. Boats race under the IRC handicap system.

Past winners 
 2003. 24 entries -Nieuwpoort    -    'General Tapioca'  -  Berret prototype 1978. Timber. Fractional rig. Fin and bulb keel.
 2005. 30 entries -Dinard    -    'Ginko' -  Mauric production 1968. Super Challenger. Masthead rig.
 2007. 25 entries- Dún Laoghaire    -    'Henry Lloyd Harmony' -   Humphreys prototype 1980. Timber. Swept back fractional rig.
 2009. 23 entries- Nieuwpoort    -    'General Tapioca'  -  Berret prototype 1978. Timber. Fractional rig. Fin and bulb keel.
 2011. 38 entries -Cowes    -    'Chimp'  -  Berret prototype 1978. Timber. Swept back fractional rig. 9.4m. o/a.
 2013. 29 entries - (Boulogne sur Mer) - 'Checkmate' - Humphreys production MGHS30. 1985 Epoxy sandwich construction?. Swept back fractional rig. Fin keel without bulb.(Similar rig to Henry Lloyd Harmony)

From 2013 Championship held annually:

 2014. 22 entries-St.Quay Portrieux, Brittany- 'Swuzzlebubble' - Bruce Farr 1977, two-off Plywood construction. Much modified by Mark Mills with new low V.C.G. lead keel without a bulb, and with laminar flow keel section with hollow trailing edge, swept back fractional rig with wide shroud base, non-overlapping jibs etc.
 2015. 22 entries - (Nieuwpoort, Belgium) - 'Checkmate'- Humphreys production MGHS30. 1985.  seriously modified with new cockpit and modifications listed above.
 2016. 20 entries (Falmouth, Cornwall, England.) 'Swuzzlebubble' - Bruce Farr 1977.
 2017. 21 entries (Kinsale, Co. Cork, Ireland.) 'Swuzzlebubble' - Bruce Farr 1977 modified 2015? Owned by Phil Plumtree.
 2018. 19 entries (Nieuwpoort, Belgium) 'Checkmate XV' highly modified Humphreys MGHS30 owned by Dave Cullen, Howth Yacht Club 

 2020. Half Ton Classics Cup cancelled due to international virus.

Designers

The most successful or popular designs were prepared by the following designers
David Andrieu (FRA)
Georg Nissen (DEU) Play and Loss
Laurie Davidson (NZL)
Doug Peterson(USA)
Jean Berret (FRA) - 'Chimp' etc. 
Tony Castro.(POR)
Ed Dubois (GBR)
Bruce Farr (NZ) - 'Swuzzlebubble' etc.
Jacques Fauroux (FRA)
Groupe Finot (FRA)
Giles Gahinet (FRA)
Ron Holland (Ireland)
Michel Joubert (FRA)- 'SpAce Odyssey' etc..
Georg Nissen
Peter Norlin (SWE)-  'Scampi'  etc..
Rob Humphreys (GBR)-  'MGHS30' etc.
Stephen Jones (GBR)
Andre Mauric (FRA)
Bernt Andersson (SWE)
Håkan Södergren (SWE)
David Thomas (GBR)
Van de Stadt (NED)
Judel Vrolijk (NED)
Hugh Welbourn  (GBR)-  'Chia Chia'
Paul Whiting (NZ) 
Ron Swanson (Aus)

Boats
Boats designed for the competition include:

See also
Mini Ton class
Quarter Ton class
Three-Quarter Ton class
One Ton class
Two Ton class
Midget Ocean Racing Club

References

External links
 http://www.belgi.net/halfton/
 http://www.histoiredeshalfs.com/

Keelboats
Development sailing classes